Volare is a 2019 Italian drama film directed by Gabriele Salvatores.

Cast
Claudio Santamaria as Willy
Valeria Golino as Elena Masato
Diego Abatantuono as Mario Topoli
Giulio Pranno as Vincent Masato
Daniel Vivian as Dragan
Marusa Majer as Anja
Tania Garribba as Lorena
Maria Gnecchi as Danja

References

External links

2019 films
Films directed by Gabriele Salvatores
2010s Italian-language films
2019 drama films
Italian drama films
2010s Italian films